Hipermestra is an opera in a prologue and 3 acts by Francesco Cavalli - more specifically, it is a festa teatrale. The opera was set to a libretto by G. A. Moniglia, and was first performed at Florence on 12 June 1658. The plot is based upon the ancient tale of Hypermnestra, a story that also later served as a basis for a well-known libretto Ipermestra by Metastasio. It was staged several times up to 1680.

Modern performances
The opera was revived by the Early Music festival in Utrecht in 2006 by La Sfera Armoniosa under Mike Fentross.

A modern production staged by Graham Vick and conducted by William Christie took place at Glyndebourne in 2017 .

Roles

Recordings
L'Ipermestra La Sfera Armoniosa & Mike Fentross  Utrecht Early Music Festival  2006
Glyndebourne 2017.

References

Operas
Operas by Francesco Cavalli
1658 operas
Italian-language operas